Argent Corporation was a company in Las Vegas that at one time controlled the Hacienda Hotel/Casino, the Stardust Resort & Casino, the Fremont Hotel and Casino and the casino in the Marina Hotel. The company was owned by Allen R. Glick, a San Diego real estate investor. The name Argent came from the three initials of his name, combined with the first three letters of the word "Enterprises". Over a few years, federal, state and local gaming officials in Nevada confirmed that these casinos were controlled by organized crime families in the Midwest and that a huge skimming operation was conducted within the casinos.

Argent purchased the Hacienda in 1974 and obtained a Nevada gaming license. Argent then purchased the Recrion Corporation, which owned the Stardust and Fremont. The purchase was financed by a loan from the Teamsters Central States Pension Fund. After Argent purchased the Stardust, Frank Rosenthal was installed as a manager, although he did not have a Nevada gaming license. The Nevada Gaming Commission refused to license Rosenthal because of his past criminal convictions, and Rosenthal began changing job titles to positions that did not require state licensing.  Rosenthal's story was fictionalized in the movie, Casino, where he is played by Robert De Niro.  During the time that Argent owned the four casinos, between $7 million and $15 million is estimated to have been skimmed from the casinos and sent to organized crime members in Chicago, Milwaukee, and Kansas City. Argent was forced out of the casino industry in the late 1970s.  Glick denied any wrongdoing and was never charged with a crime.  He became a cooperating witness, immunized from prosecution in a criminal case in 1983 against 15 individuals charged in the skimming operation.  The 15 individuals indicted included many people in the top echelon of organized crime: Joseph Aiuppa, Jackie Cerone, Joseph Lombardo and Anthony Spilotro from the Chicago Outfit; Frank Balistrieri and his two sons from the Milwaukee crime family; and Carl Civella from the Kansas City crime family.

In 1975, two people with business connections to Allen Glick were shot and killed. Tamara Rand lent $500,000 to Glick to help fund his purchase of the Recrion Corporation.  She later claimed that this entitled her to a 5% ownership share in Argent. On November 9, 1975, Rand was shot five times with a silencer-equipped .22 caliber gun at her home in San Diego.  Edward (Marty) Buccieri was a pit boss at Caesars Palace in Las Vegas who had connections with a number of mobsters. In May 1975, he was found dead in a car after being shot in the head with a .25 caliber gun. Buccieri had demanded a $30,000 finders fee from Glick for his help in obtaining the loan from the Teamsters Pension Fund, and had reportedly physically threatened Glick.  Neither homicide was solved.

See also
 List of defunct gambling companies

Notes

References
Pileggi, Nicholas. Casino: Love and Honor in Las Vegas, 

1970s establishments in Nevada
1970s disestablishments in Nevada
Companies based in the Las Vegas Valley
Defunct companies based in Nevada
Defunct gambling companies
Gambling companies of the United States